Connie Francis sings The Songs of Les Reed is studio album recorded by U. S. Entertainer Connie Francis. It is the last album Francis recorded under her long-term contract with MGM Records which had been signed in 1955.

Background
Although not really a commercial success Francis' 1968 album Connie Francis Sings Bacharach & David, a portrait of the songwriting collaboration between Burt Bacharach and Hal David had received enough critical praise to repeat the concept. This time, Francis portrayed the work of British composer Les Reed. In 1979 Polydor Records released a two-record set of both albums.

Principal recording took place on September 6, 8 and 9, 1969 at Wessex Studios in London. Additional vocals and instrumental overdubs were recorded September 25, 1969 in New York.

Arrangements were provided by David Whitaker and Les Reed himself. Both also appeared as conductors.

Track listing

Side A

Side B

References

External links
Official Connie Francis Fan Club Site

Connie Francis albums
MGM Records albums
1969 albums
Albums conducted by Les Reed (songwriter)
Albums conducted by David Whitaker (composer)